Guatemala competed at the 1984 Summer Paralympics in Stoke Mandeville, Great Britain and New York City, United States. 4 competitors from Guatemala won no medals and so did not place in the medal table.

See also 
 Guatemala at the Paralympics
 Guatemala at the 1984 Summer Olympics

References 

Guatemala at the Paralympics
Nations at the 1984 Summer Paralympics
1984 in Guatemalan sport